Romerus is a small genus of rhacophorid frogs that are distributed in southern China (Hong Kong, Hainan, Guangxi, Guangdong). Some species now in Romerus were originally placed in Philautus. It is thought to be the most basal genus in the Rhacophorinae.

The genus was first erected as Liuixalus in 2008 based on molecular genetic evidence showing distinctness of Liuixalus romeri (then known as Chiromantis romeri) from the rest of Chiromantis. The genus name Liuixalus commemorates , a Chinese herpetologist. In 2021, another phylogenetic study deemed the name Liuixalus as invalidly proposed due to a lack of a diagnosis for the genus in the original study, and thus redescribed the genus as Romerus, alongside morphological characteristics distinguishing it. The name Romerus commemorates British herpetologist John D. Romer.

The International Union for Conservation of Nature (IUCN) has assessed two species of the genus as vulnerable (Romerus ocellatus and R. hainanus), one as endangered (R. romeri), and one as least-concern (R. feii), while Romerus shiwandashan is considered data deficient.

Species
There are six recognized species in the genus Romerus:
 Romerus calcarius (Milto, Poyarkov, Orlov, and Nguyen, 2013)
 Romerus feii Yang, Rao, and Wang, 2015
 Romerus hainanus (Liu and Wu, 2004)
 Romerus ocellatus (Liu and Hu, 1973)
 Romerus romeri (Smith, 1953)
 Romerus shiwandashan (Li, Mo, Jiang, Xie, and Jiang, 2015)

References

 
Rhacophoridae
Amphibians of Asia
Endemic fauna of China
Amphibian genera